Goniocloeus is a genus of fungus weevils in the beetle family Anthribidae. There are at least 40 described species in Goniocloeus.

Species
These 40 species belong to the genus Goniocloeus:

 Goniocloeus acerbus Wolfrum, 1953
 Goniocloeus apicalis Jordan, 1904
 Goniocloeus armatus Jordan, 1897
 Goniocloeus baccatus Jordan, 1904
 Goniocloeus bimaculatus (Olivier, 1795)
 Goniocloeus capucinus Jordan, 1904
 Goniocloeus carbonarius Jordan, 1906
 Goniocloeus curvatus Jordan, 1906
 Goniocloeus fractus Jordan, 1906
 Goniocloeus funereus Jordan, 1906
 Goniocloeus hirsutus Jordan, 1904
 Goniocloeus icas Jordan, 1906
 Goniocloeus insignis Jordan, 1906
 Goniocloeus inversus Jordan, 1906
 Goniocloeus laticeps Jordan, 1906
 Goniocloeus linifer Jordan, 1906
 Goniocloeus marilis Jordan, 1937
 Goniocloeus melas Jordan, 1904
 Goniocloeus mexicanus Jordan, 1906
 Goniocloeus minor Jordan, 1904
 Goniocloeus morulus Jordan, 1937
 Goniocloeus nanus Jordan, 1906
 Goniocloeus niger Jordan, 1904
 Goniocloeus orbitalis Lacordaire, 1866
 Goniocloeus ornaticeps Jordan, 1906
 Goniocloeus parvulus Jordan, 1906
 Goniocloeus planipennis Kirsch, 1873
 Goniocloeus politus Jordan, 1906
 Goniocloeus pumilus Jordan, 1906
 Goniocloeus pusillus Jordan, 1906
 Goniocloeus quadrinotatus Say, 1827
 Goniocloeus rectus Wolfrum, 1938
 Goniocloeus reflexus Jordan, 1906
 Goniocloeus silvanus Jordan, 1906
 Goniocloeus spiculosus Gyllenhal, 1833
 Goniocloeus tarsalis Jordan, 1904
 Goniocloeus tholerus Jordan, 1906
 Goniocloeus triruptus Wolfrum, 1933
 Goniocloeus tuberculatus Olivier, 1795
 Goniocloeus umbrinus Jordan, 1904

References

Further reading

 
 

Anthribidae
Articles created by Qbugbot